The ceremonial county of Kent, (which includes the unitary authority of Medway), is divided into 17 parliamentary constituencies - one borough constituency and 16 county constituencies.

Constituencies

2010 boundary changes
Under the Fifth Periodic Review of Westminster constituencies, the Boundary Commission for England decided to retain Kent's 17 constituencies for the 2010 election, making minor changes to realign constituency boundaries with the boundaries of current local government wards, and to reduce the electoral disparity between constituencies, including the transfer of Cliftonville from North Thanet to South Thanet. They recommended two name changes: Gillingham to Gillingham and Rainham to reflect the similar stature of the two towns, and Medway to Rochester and Strood to avoid confusion with the larger Medway unitary authority.

Proposed boundary changes 
See 2023 Periodic Review of Westminster constituencies for further details.

Following the abandonment of the Sixth Periodic Review (the 2018 review), the Boundary Commission for England formally launched the 2023 Review on 5 January 2021. Initial proposals were published on 8 June 2021 and, following two periods of public consultation, revised proposals were published on 8 November 2022. Final proposals will be published by 1 July 2023.

The commission has proposed that an additional seat is created in Kent, with the formation of the constituency of Weald of Kent. As a consequence, Maidstone and the Weald, and Tonbridge and Malling would be renamed Maidstone and Malling, and Tonbridge respectively. Changes to North Thanet and South Thanet would result in them being replaced by Herne Bay and Sandwich, and East Thanet respectively. Although only subject to a very minor boundary change, Dover would revert to its previous name of Dover and Deal.

The following constituencies are proposed:

Containing electoral wards from Ashford
Ashford (part)
Weald of Kent (part)
Containing electoral wards from Canterbury
Canterbury
Herne Bay and Sandwich (part)
Containing electoral wards from Dartford
Dartford
Sevenoaks (part)
Containing electoral wards from Dover
Dover and Deal
Herne Bay and Sandwich (part)
Containing electoral wards from Folkestone and Hythe
Ashford (part)
Folkestone and Hythe
Containing electoral wards from Gravesham
Gravesham
Containing electoral wards from Maidstone
Faversham and Mid Kent (part)
Maidstone and Malling (part)
Weald of Kent (part)
Containing electoral wards from Medway
Chatham and Aylesford (part)
Gillingham and Rainham
Rochester and Strood
Containing electoral wards from Sevenoaks
Sevenoaks (part)
Tonbridge (part)
Containing electoral wards from Swale
Faversham and Mid Kent (part)
Sittingbourne and Sheppey
Containing electoral wards from Thanet
East Thanet
Herne Bay and Sandwich (part)
Containing electoral wards from Tonbridge and Malling
Chatham and Aylesford (part)
Maidstone and Malling (part)
Tonbridge (part)
Containing electoral wards from Tunbridge Wells
Tunbridge Wells
Weald of Kent (part)

Results history 
Primary data source: House of Commons research briefing - General election results from 1918 to 2019

2019 
The number of votes cast for each political party who fielded candidates in constituencies comprising Kent in the 2019 general election were as follows:

Percentage votes 

11974 & 1979 - Liberal Party; 1983 & 1987 - SDP-Liberal Alliance

* Included in Other

Seats

Maps

1885-1910

1918-1945

1950-1970

1974-present

Historic representation by party
A cell marked → (with a different colour background to the preceding cell) indicates that the previous MP continued to sit under a new party name.

1885 to 1918

1918 to 1950

1950 to 1974

1974 to present

See also 

 List of parliamentary constituencies in the South East (region)

Notes

References

 
Kent
Politics of Kent
 
Parliamentary constituencies